James R.J. Strickler (born June 23, 1954, in Lockhart, Texas) is an American politician and a Republican member of the New Mexico House of Representatives representing District 2 since January 2007.

Elections
 2012 Strickler was unopposed for both the June 5, 2012 Republican Primary, winning with 1,227 votes and the November 6, 2012 General election, winning with 6,924 votes.
 2006 When District 2 Republican Representative Richard Cheney left the Legislature, Strickler was unopposed for the June 6, 2006 Republican Primary, winning with 1,125 votes and won the November 7, 2006 General election with 3,905 votes (62.5%) against Democratic nominee Alice Slaven-Emond.
 2008 Strickler and his returning 2006 Democratic opponent Slaven-Emond were both unopposed for their June 8, 2008 primaries, setting up a rematch; Strickler won the November 4, 2008 General election with 6,120 votes (63.8%) against Slaven-Emond.
 2010 Strickler was unopposed for both the June 1, 2010 Republican Primary, winning with 1,880 votes and the November 2, 2010 General election, winning with 5,935 votes.

References

External links
 Official page at the New Mexico Legislature
 
 James R.J. Strickler at Ballotpedia
 James R.J. Strickler at the National Institute on Money in State Politics

People from Lockhart, Texas
1954 births
Living people
Republican Party members of the New Mexico House of Representatives
People from Farmington, New Mexico
21st-century American politicians